Straumfjordvatnet is a lake in the municipality of Steigen in Nordland county, Norway.

See also
List of lakes in Norway

References

Steigen
Lakes of Nordland